The Virginia Slims of Utah is a defunct women's tennis tournament first held in 1980 and played a further three times from 1983 to 1985. It was held in Salt Lake City in the United States and played on outdoor hard courts.

Past finals

Singles

Doubles

References

 
Hard court tennis tournaments
Defunct tennis tournaments in the United States